Claes Nobel (July 20, 1930 – April 28, 2021) was the founder of the National Society of High School Scholars.

Biography 

Nobel was born in Copenhagen, Denmark, on July 20, 1930. His parents were Alf and Esther Nobel. Nobel was the grandson of Ludvig Nobel and grand nephew to Alfred Nobel, who established the Nobel Prizes. He was a native of Sweden.

Nobel moved to the US in 1959 to study business.

Nobel and Jim Lewis co-founded the National Society of High School Scholars in 2002.

Nobel was honored at the Artivist Film Festival in November 2007 for his work in humanitarian and environmental causes.

Personal life 
Nobel married actress Margaretha Henning Nobel, who he met in 1956. They had four children.

He died at home in Portland, Oregon, at the age of 90 on April 28, 2021.

References

Further reading

External links 
 National Society of High School Scholars

Swedish humanitarians
Swedish environmentalists
1930 births
2021 deaths
Claes
People from Copenhagen